The Inambari River in southeastern Peru flows  from the Cordillera Apolobamba in the Andes to the Madre de Dios River. The river spans the Puno and Madre de Dios regions.

Tributaries include the rivers Yanaqucha, Pukaramayu, Mancuari, Wila Uma, Blanco, San Bartolome, Yawarmayu and Winchusmayu. The Inambari passes through the towns of Cuyocuyo, Sandia and Massiapo, Pacaysuizo, Isilluma and St. Helena.

References

Rivers of Peru
Rivers of Madre de Dios Region
Rivers of Puno Region